Agosto may refer to:c

Agosto (surname)
Agosto (film), a 1987 French film
Agosto (novel) (1990), by Rubem Fonseca
 "Agosto" (song), a 2015 song by Álvaro Solerg

See also
 Clube Desportivo Primeiro de Agosto